John of Mecklenburg may refer to:

 John I, Duke of Mecklenburg (1326–1392/93) 
 Johann VII, Duke of Mecklenburg-Schwerin (1558–1592)